The men's downhill competition at the 1998 Asian Games in Khao Yai National Park, Nakhon Ratchasima Province was held on 7 December at the Khao Yai Rimthan Resort.

Schedule
All times are Indochina Time (UTC+07:00)

Results
Legend
DSQ — Disqualified

References

External links
Results
Official website

Mountain Men Downhill